Derek Boshier (born 1937, in Portsmouth) is an English artist, among the first proponents of British pop art.
 He works in various media including painting, drawing, collage, and sculpture. In the 1970s he shifted from painting to photography, film, video, assemblage, and installations, but he returned to painting by the end of the decade. Addressing the question of what shapes his work, Boshier once stated "Most important is life itself, my sources tend to be current events, personal events, social and political situations, and a sense of place and places".  His work uses popular culture and the mixing of high and low culture to confront government, revolution, sex, technology and war with subversive dark humor.

He has been commissioned by David Bowie, The Clash, and The Pretty Things.

Education and Profession

Derek Boshier attended Yeovil School of art in Somerset, England from 1953-1957 (B.F.A.). He attended the Royal College of Art in London, 1959-1962 alongside David Hockney, Pauline Boty, Allen Jones and Peter Phillips, receiving his M.F.A. in 1962.

The boredom of the previous few years of National Service in the [Royal Engineers] had been alleviated by reading the works of Marshall McLuhan. During his college years, his work was didactic, commenting on the space race, the all-powerful multinationals and the increasing Americanisation of English culture.

After graduating, he spent a year traveling in India on an Indian government scholarship. Boshier served as an instructor at the Central School of Art and Design, London from 1963-1979  and concurrently at the Royal Collage of Art London from 1973–1979. Boshier moved to Houston Texas in 1980, after accepting a one-year visiting artist position at the University of Houston, and then joined the faculty there from 1981–1992. He moved back to England 1992-1997 and later joined the faculty of the California Institute of Arts in Los Angeles in 1997, where he has lived ever since. Though associated with the art and culture of both London and Los Angeles, Boshier has also lived in Houston, Somerset and Wales.

Career

Royal College

Pop Goes the Easel 
While still at the Royal College of Art Derek Boshier appeared with Peter Blake, Pauline Boty and Peter Phillips in Pop Goes the Easel (1962), a film by Ken Russell for the BBC's Monitor series. A pioneering program, Monitor's editors encouraged Russell to be ambitious and the resulting film can also be seen as a collaboration, taking inspiration from the formal aesthetics and themes within work of its artist-subjects.  Like the work of Boshier, the film was a spliced and shuffled collage that startled its viewers.  Pop Goes the Easel established the similarities that united this group of pop artists while also establishing their differences.  Boshier emerged as relatively articulate and concerned with social issues and critical writings on the impact of advertising on social identity and democratic politics.  Though he used the materials of pop art such as flags maps and comics, we can see in his early work a marked political concern, especially with current events and expansion of American power.  Boshier believed that, "The world's at peril," and that it was impossible to avoid being political.

Royal College Notable Works 
Notable works that came out of Boshier's time at the Royal College show his differentiating concern with political action and discourse.

 Special K
 I Wonder What my Heroes Think of the Space Race
 Man Playing Snooker and Thinking of Other Things
 The Identi-Kit Man

The film forever placed Boshier at Pop Art's origins and anointed him one of its British kings.  As is a theme within Boshier's life and work, he and Russell became friends and Boshier later played the role of John Everett Millais in Russell's television film Dante's Inferno (1967); his girlfriend Gala Mitchell played Jane Morris.

1970s 
Feeling that painting was too not able to properly carry the assault of images in every day life Boshier stopped painting for 13 years, instead using photographs, films and book art that was often political.  It is at this time that Bosher's interest in technologies of representation became obvious.  Through this topic he explored his other interests of the close connection between life and art, accessibility of art and the related breakdown between high and low art.  His groundbreaking exhibition "Lives: An exhibition of artists whose work is based on other people's lives" subsequently took place at The Hayward Gallery in 1979. While using many mediums, Boshier always continued to draw and it is through this drawings that the viewer is most connected to the consistent way Boshier uses the concepts of style, graphic, and representation to use art to leave his own signature, as it were, on the popular elements we borrows.

Career 
Never one to allow his message to be governed by any particular medium, at the 1964 The New Generation show at the Whitechapel Gallery he exhibited large shaped canvases with vibrant areas of evenly applied colour. Boshier's work was included in the exhibition "Around the Automobile" in 1965 at The Museum of Modern Art, New York. After 1966 he has used metal, coloured plastics, even neon light, the materials of the commercial sign maker, to create three-dimensional objects. Also he has experimented both with books and film.

After making a name for himself as one of Pop Art's elite, starting in the 1970s Boshier created work that broke out of the genre including progressively more graphic figurative paintings and hard-edged, non representational canvases on the border of Op Art. His work in photography, screen-print, film, collage, and assemblage has led critic Jonathan Griffin to argue that Derek Boshier, although foremost a painter, is most vastly a contemporary artist than just a pop artist.

During the early 1970s Boshier taught at Central School of Art and Design where one of his pupils was John Mellor (later known as Joe Strummer of The Clash). This led to Boshier designing The Clash's second song book which included a collection of drawings and paintings released in conjunction with the album Give 'Em Enough Rope.

In 1979 at the request of David Bowie, portrait photographer Brian Duffy introduced the two artists.  This meeting resulted in a 37-year friendship that lasted until Bowie's death.   Boshier designed David Bowie cover art for Lodger and Let's Dance. For Lodger, Boshier also designed the inner gatefold which featured a college of images representing the themes of life and death.  Boshier also designed stage sets for Bowie.

Derek Boshier moved to Houston, Texas in the 1980s, at a time when contemporary art in Texas and Houston in particular, were receiving national and international attention. The Houston skyline and other impressions of the region, from cowboys to corporate business executives (suggestive of the oil industry or Texas Instruments Inc.), appeared in a number of his canvases from this period. Several notable museum exhibitions included or surveyed his work form this period including: "Derek Boshier: Paintings from 1980–1981", Contemporary Arts Museum Houston 1981; "Derek Boshier: Texas Works", Institute of Contemporary Arts, London 1982; "Fresh Paint, The Houston School" Museum of Fine Arts, Houston 1985 (traveling to P.S.1 Contemporary Art Center (now MoMA PS1), Long Island City, New York); "Derek Boshier: The Texas Years", Contemporary Art Museum, Houston 1995.

Boshier now lives in Los Angeles, USA. Social commentary has once more become a major element of his work tackling head on subjects that have strong political overtones such as gun control, police brutality and once again, the multinationals - this time on home turf. He is a visiting lecturer at University of California Los Angeles School of Arts where he teaches drawing.

Themes

American culture and influence 
Starting at the Royal College Boshier explored his fascination with the soft-power and hybrid marketing and cross-referencing of products, notably Special K cereal, as a means of diffusing and neutralizing American influence. Perpetually interested in "the now", Boshier also explored the space race in 1962. The resulting paintings, The Most Handsome Hero of the Cosmos and Mr. Shepherd and I Wonder What My Heroes Think of the Space Race, explore what he saw as traditional heroes, defined by epic adventure, being supplanted by celebrities who were famous for being famous.   Boshier saw the astronaught as a counter balance to this trend and through these works painted them in historical and heroic contexts.

Unlike other pop artists of his era, especially those captured in Russell's Pop Goes the Easel, Boshier was outspokenly critical of the expansion of American influence and the impact of advertising on identity, seen in The Identi-Kit Man and Man Playing Snooker and Thinking of Other Things. Through these works we also see Boshier's reflections on the fragility and fragmentation of heterosexual masculinity in the face of technology and consumption.

Beliefs About Art 
Highly influenced by Samuel Beckett, Boshier has said that the not knowing, the unknowability that ultimately make art compelling for him.  For Boshier, Pop Art denotes not just "popular" but also the potential for a "popularism" that is unlike political popularism with its de facto opposition to the elite.  Instead, Boshier's work celebrates commonly held experiences without making distinctions between high and low or historical and contemporary.

Friendships 
Within in the art world Derek Boshier is famous for the way he builds and maintains friendships.  David Hockney, a close friend of Boshier's since 1957 when they met during their interview for the Royal College of Art, describes, "He sends me things by ordinary mail that always have decorated envelopes...Sometimes it's a cutting from a newspaper (very old fashioned) or a drawing. I assume he does this for a lot of other people." Hockney has also said of Derek Boshier that he has always kept his sense of wonder.

Public collections
Muzeum Sztuki Łódź, Poland 
 Tate Gallery - his 1962 painting The Identi-Kit Man was purchased in 1971.
The Museum of Fine Arts, Houston
Museum of Modern Art, New York

Bibliography
Exhibition catalogues
Anonymous (1982). Derek Boshier: Texas Works. Institute of Contemporary Arts. London, 32 pp.
Barbara Rose and Susie Kalil (1985). Fresh Paint, The Houston School. Texas Monthly Press, Austin, Texas. 256 pp. 
Mayo, Marti, Guy Brett, and Lynn Herbert (1995). Derek Boshier: The Texas Years. Contemporary Art Museum, Houston/Distributed Art Publishers. 64 pp. 
Weitman, Wendy (1999). Pop Impressions Europe/USA: Prints and Multiples from A The Museum of Modern Art, New York. 136 pp. 
Derek Boshier Works on paper, a retrospective 1955-2003 [Catalogue of the exhibition held at Mary Elizabeth Dee Shaw Gallery 2003] Utah.
Derek Boshier: New Paintings, Chemical Culture Series [Catalogue of the exhibition held at Flowers  East 2008] London.
Extreme Makeover [Catalogue of the exhibition held at Flowers Gallery May 9 - June 14, 2008] New York.
Journals, Magazines, and Newspapers
Bloom, Suzanne and Ed Hill (1985), Derek Boshier, Texas Gallery. Artforum, September, 24(1): 131
Cotter, Holland (1986). Derek Boshier at TotahStelling. Art in America, October, 74(10): 57–59. 
Reinhold, Robert (1983). Cities in Texas Witness Flowering of Fine Arts. New York Times, May 14.

See also
What Do Artists Do All Day?

References

External links
His official website 
contact website 

1937 births
Living people
Alumni of the Royal College of Art
English contemporary artists